A snippet is defined as a small piece of something; it may in more specific contexts refer to:
 Sampling (music), the use of a short phrase of a recording as an element in a new piece of music
 Snipets, (sic) a series of short TV interstitials produced by Kaiser Broadcasting and Field Communications in the 1970s and early 1980s
 Snippet (programming), a short reusable piece of computer source code
 Solder, in small pieces
"Snippet", a song by Blonde Redhead from Blonde Redhead